Ado Johanson (also Ado Johannson; 1 March 1874 Vastemõisa Parish (now Põhja-Sakala Parish), Kreis Fellin – 9 January 1932 Tallinn) was an Estonian politician. He was a member of the III and IV Riigikogu, representing the Farmers' Assemblies.

References

1874 births
1932 deaths
People from Põhja-Sakala Parish
People from Kreis Fellin
Farmers' Assemblies politicians
Members of the Riigikogu, 1926–1929
Members of the Riigikogu, 1929–1932